A  is a traditional Shinto shrine gate.

Torii may refer to:

Torii family, a samurai clan
Torii school, a school of ukiyo-e artists
Torii (surname), a Japanese surname
 Torii Hunter (born 1975), American baseball player

See also

Tori (disambiguation)
Torie, a given name and nickname
Toril (disambiguation)
Torin (disambiguation)
Torri (disambiguation)